Blaya, stage name of Karla Rodrigues (born May 27, 1987), is a Brazilian-born Portuguese singer and dancer.

Career 

Blaya started singing in 2001, but her professional career only began in 2008, after joining Buraka Som Sistema as a dancer, eventually becoming one of the group's vocalists. The partnership with the band lasted until 2016, after the group announced its hiatus for undetermined time. Before that, in 2013, Blaya released a free solo EP, the self-named Blaya. To promote the EP, she released the music video for "Superfresh", one of the EP's tracks, in December 2013.

After a period of dance teaching, Blaya returned to singing. In March 2018, she released her single "Faz Gostoso", which was a huge success in Portugal. "Faz Gostoso" was a top hit on the Portuguese charts and earned more than 24 million views on YouTube. The song was covered by American singer Madonna on her 2019 album Madame X.
In September 2018, Blaya released two singles simultaneously, along with their respective music videos: "Má Vida" and "Vem na Vibe". In the same month, Portuguese TV station TVI premiered the telenovela, Valor da Vida and its opening song, "Tudo Passou", is sung by Blaya. "Tudo Passou" incorporates musical and lyric elements of Kaoma's hit single, "Lambada". The video was shot in Guimarães.

Personal life 

Even though Blaya was born in Brazil, she went to Portugal when she was only two months old. His father was a Brazilian football player who played for Amora FC. Blaya was raised in Ferreira do Alentejo before definitely settling in the Greater Lisbon area.

In 2012, she publicly announced her bisexuality.

In July 2017 she gave birth to her first child, a girl named Aura Electra Rodrigues Russo.

Discography

Singles

Awards and nominations

References 

Living people
1987 births
21st-century Portuguese women singers
Portuguese female dancers
People from Fortaleza
People from Beja District
Bisexual singers
Portuguese LGBT singers
Bisexual dancers
Portuguese bisexual people
Brazilian emigrants to Portugal
20th-century Portuguese LGBT people
21st-century Portuguese LGBT people